Legislative elections were held in Åland on 17 October 1999 to elect members of the Lagtinget. The 30 members were elected for a four-year term by proportional representation. They were the first elections contested by the Åland Centre in which it did not emerge as the largest party, narrowly losing out to the Liberals for Åland.

The Åland Progress Group was a new party that was formed during the 1995 - 1999 session of the Lagting by a member of the Lagting who until that point had been a member of Freeminded Co-operation.

Following the elections, the previous government formed by Åland Centre, Freeminded Co-operation and one independent, was replaced by one comprising the Åland Centre, Freeminded Co-operation and the Non-aligned Coalition. However following a motion of no confidence in March 2001 this was replaced by a government made up of the Åland Centre and Liberals for Åland.

Results

References

External links
Parties and Elections in Europe
Legislative Assembly elections

Elections in Åland
Aland
1999 in Finland
October 1999 events in Europe